Rose Zhang (born May 24, 2003) is an American amateur golfer. She won the 2020 U.S. Women's Amateur and the 2022 NCAA Division I Championship. She competed in the 2019 U.S. Women's Open and was on the gold medal team at the 2019 Pan American Games.

Personal life
Zhang was born in Arcadia, California and resides in Irvine, California. 

She began golfing at the age of 9. 

Zhang attended Pacific Academy and enrolled at Stanford University in 2021.

Amateur career
In 2019, Zhang was one of the youngest competitors in the Augusta National Women's Amateur. She was named by American Junior Golf Association as the 2019 Girls Rolex Junior Player of the Year. 

She competed in the 2019 U.S. Women's Open at 16 years of age. 

At the 2019 Pan American Games, she was on the winning U.S. mixed-gender team and placed eighth in the individual competition. 

Zhang won the U.S. Women's Amateur in August 2020 after defeating Gabriela Ruffels in the final on the 38th hole. 

Following the win, Zhang rose to number 1 in the World Amateur Golf Ranking in September 2020 after finishing T-11 at the 2020 ANA Inspiration, an LPGA major. She has won the Mark H. McCormack Medal as the top-ranked amateur three times, at the end of the 2020, 2021, and 2022 seasons.

In May 2022, Zhang won the individual NCAA Championship by 3 shots. On her 19th birthday she was presented with the Annika Award for best female college golfer of the year. She then clinched Stanford's second NCAA team title by winning the final match, 3 and 1. 

In June 2022, Adidas announced its first name, image, and likeness deal with Zhang, making her the company's first student athlete. The multi-year deal was announced on the morning of Zhang entering the U.S. Women's Open.

Amateur wins
2016 AJGA - CJGT Junior at Yorba Linda
2017 Junior PGA Championship, Junior America's Cup
2018 ANA Junior Inspiration, Swinging Skirts AJGA Invitational, The PING Invitational
2019 Toyota Junior World Cup, Swinging Skirts AJGA Invitational, Rolex Tournament of Champions
2020 U.S. Women's Amateur, Rolex Girls Junior Championship, The PING Invitational, Rolex Tournament of Champions
2021 U.S. Girls' Junior, Molly Collegiate Invitational, Windy City Collegiate Classic, Stanford Intercollegiate, Spirit International Amateur Championship (individual)
2022 NCAA Championship

Source:

U.S. national team appearances
Junior Solheim Cup: 2017 (winners), 2019 (winners)
Junior Ryder Cup: 2018 (winners)
Curtis Cup: 2021 (winners), 2022 (winners)
Spirit International Amateur: 2021 (winners)
Arnold Palmer Cup: 2022
Espirito Santo Trophy: 2022

Source:

References

American female golfers
Amateur golfers
Stanford Cardinal women's golfers
Winners of ladies' major amateur golf championships
Pan American Games medalists in golf
Pan American Games gold medalists for the United States
Golfers at the 2019 Pan American Games
Medalists at the 2019 Pan American Games
Golfers from California
Sportspeople from Irvine, California
People from Arcadia, California
2003 births
Living people
21st-century American women